WildBrain Ltd. (formerly known as DHX Media, Ltd.) is a Canadian media, animation studio, production, and brand licensing company, mostly associated as an entertainment company. The company is known for owning the largest library of children's television programming, which is distributed through its multi-channel network, WildBrain Spark, and a group of Canadian specialty television channels.

DHX was founded in 2006 when the entertainment entrepreneurs Michael Donovan and Steven DeNure gained control of Decode Entertainment and the Halifax Film Company.

History

As DHX Media

In 2006, the Toronto-based Decode Entertainment and Halifax-based Halifax Film Company merged so that the newly merged company would be named the Decode-Halifax Film Company. The newly public company known as DHX Media, began trading in 2006, because the name, "DHX", is an acronym for the combination of the names Decode and Halifax.

A reverse merger deal with Entertainment One was considered in 2008, but was dropped. On March 25, 2008, DHX Media acquired Bulldog Interactive Fitness. On September 8, 2010, all related subsidiaries and divisions were rebranded under the label DHX Media. On September 14, 2010, DHX Media acquired the American animation studio Wildbrain Entertainment.

On August 20, 2012, it was announced that DHX Media would acquire Cookie Jar Group for CA $111 million, a deal which would make DHX the world's largest independent owner of children's television programming. The acquisition was completed on October 22, 2012.

In May 2013, DHX introduced three premium, subscription-based channels on YouTube; DHX Junior, DHX Kids, and DHX Retro. DHX's then executive chairman Michael Hirsh stated that the offerings were meant to leverage the company's library and the growth of digital distribution in the children's television market. DHX was among the first 30 content partners for YouTube's premium channel platform.

On September 16, 2013, DHX acquired Ragdoll Worldwide—a joint venture between British production company Ragdoll Productions, BBC Worldwide and an investment group that managed and licensed Ragdoll Productions' properties (such as Teletubbies) outside the United Kingdom.

Expansion into broadcasting, subsequent partnerships 
The networks were being sold as a condition of Bell Media's 2013 acquisition of the remainder of Astral Media's assets; its purchase of the networks marked DHX's first foray into television broadcasting. The deal was approved by the CRTC on July 24, 2014, and closed on July 31, 2014. The channels were incorporated into a new unit, DHX Television.

In early 2014, DHX Media acquired Epitome Pictures, the producers of Degrassi, but Epitome did not own international distribution rights. In November, DHX purchased 117 children's and family titles from US distributor Echo Bridge Home Entertainment. The acquisition comprised about 1,200 half-hours including the international distribution rights to Degrassi, as well as Instant Star and The L.A. Complex (two other Epitome productions), as well as distribution rights to an additional 34 series. Other shows in the purchase included Lunar Jim, Beast Wars: Transformers and Cookie Jar's Emily of New Moon. Nerd Corps Entertainment, a computer animation studio founded by former Mainframe Entertainment producers Asaph Fipke and Chuck Johnson, also the makers of Slugterra, was acquired by DHX Media on December 24.

In April 2015, Corus Entertainment announced that it had acquired Canadian rights to the program library of Disney Channel and its associated brands as part of a deal with the Disney–ABC Television Group; DHX's existing deal with Disney, which covered programming across the four DHX Television services, ended in January 2016. DHX's Disney-branded channels were re-branded as Family Jr. and Télémagino in September 2015.

In August 2015, DHX reached an output deal with AwesomenessTV; the deal includes rights to its programming for Family Channel, along with plans to co-develop new, original content for DHX to distribute and merchandise internationally. In December 2015, DHX reached an output deal with DreamWorks Animation, which included Canadian rights to its original animated television series, and a pact to co-produce 130 episodes of animated programming for the Family networks, with DHX handling Canadian distribution and DreamWorks handling international distribution. Also that month, DHX established a development deal with Mattel to co-develop and handle global sales for content in the Little People and Polly Pocket franchises, as well as HiT Entertainment properties owned by them such as the Bob the Builder and Fireman Sam franchises, including television and digital video programming.

In April 2016, DHX Media announced the formation of a new London-based multi-channel network under the WildBrain name. On September 21, 2016, DHX cut a deal with Air Bud Entertainment (founded by Robert Vince) distribute the Air Bud library of 15 films, including the newest Air Bud production Pup Star.

Peanuts acquisition, reorganizations 
The purchase gave DHX full ownership to the Strawberry Shortcake franchise and, more prominently, an 80% majority stake in Peanuts Worldwide.

On October 2, 2017, the company announced that it was evaluating strategic alternatives, including a potential sale, following a review of its finances. DHX's debt had increased following the Iconix acquisition, and the company reported a net loss of  during its fiscal fourth quarter. The sale would be used to help cover DHX's debt.

On September 24, 2018, DHX announced that it had concluded its strategic review and decided against selling the company, and that it planned to prioritize investments into digital content (including short-form digital content for WildBrain, and premium long-form content intended for platforms such as Amazon Video and Netflix), rather than television, to reflect changes in viewing habits. On the same day, the company also reported a revenue of CA $434.4 million for its fiscal 2018 (up from CA $298.7 million in its fiscal 2017). In November 2018, DHX announced the sale of its Halifax animation studio to IoM Media Ventures, a new company led by former DHX CEO Dana Landry. The Halifax animation studio had been operating on a loss. The sale was completed on December 21, 2018.

In February 2019, the company announced plans to consolidate its operations into two internal subsidiaries for "improved focus and strategic flexibility", focused on studios and networks, and digital respectively. During its investors' call, then CEO Michael Donovan stated that the company had slightly downsized its slate of productions to "focus on the shows we think have the greatest potential, particularly with respect to consumer products".

As WildBrain
In August 2019, former Marvel Entertainment CEO and founder of Classic Media (now DreamWorks Classics) Eric Ellenbogen was named the new CEO of DHX Media. On September 23, 2019, DHX Media announced a reorganization, including CFO Doug Lamb stepping down and being replaced by existing COO Aaron Ames, and the addition of a new "brand director" position. In addition, DHX began trading as "WildBrain", building upon its multi-channel network of the same name (which was subsequently renamed to "WildBrain Spark"). Company president Josh Scherba explained that the name was "synonymous with creativity, imagination and innovation", and symbolized the company's efforts to achieve stronger collaboration and integration between its businesses. DHX shareholders officially approved the change in corporate name during its annual shareholder meeting in December.

On February 3, 2022, WildBrain acquired distribution, production, and licensing rights to the Jay Ward Productions portfolio; both companies will create new content based on the portfolio. The deal excluded co-productions from the Bullwinkle Studios venture that was operated by DreamWorks Classics before the new deal was made.

Businesses

WildBrain CPLG (formerly Copyright Promotions Licensing Group), a third-party entertainment, sport and brand licensing agency headquartered in London, United Kingdom, which became a subsidiary to WildBrain in the process of the acquisition of Cookie Jar Entertainment.
 : WildBrain distributes television shows and specials within their library to various media platforms, territory-by-territory. The company maintains distribution offices in Toronto, Beijing, Los Angeles, New York, London, and Paris, and a support team in Toronto.
WildBrain Television: WildBrain operates four Canadian specialty television channels: three in English (Family Channel, Family Jr., and WildBrainTV) and a French-language channel (Télémagino). They were acquired in 2013 from Bell Media as part of its acquisition of Astral Media.
 : WildBrain maintains a production studio in Vancouver, British Columbia, and formally operated 3 others. 
WildBrain Spark is a multi-channel network based in London, England, that programs digital children's content on services such as YouTube—including content from WildBrain's library and properties, as well as edutainment and toys. It was formerly known as simply "WildBrain" until DHX's 2019 rebranding. The division has also entered into partnerships with other parties to manage their digital properties. The WildBrain Spark channel is among the largest children's channels on YouTube, and accounted for $70 million of WildBrain's revenue in 2019.

See also 

 List of WildBrain programs
 List of libraries owned by WildBrain

References

External links 
 
 
 
 
 Bulldog Interactive Fitness website

 
2006 establishments in Nova Scotia
Canadian companies established in 2006
Mass media companies established in 2006
Canadian animation studios
Companies based in Halifax, Nova Scotia
Television broadcasting companies of Canada